H.P. Lovecraft's Dreamlands is a fantasy tabletop role-playing supplement published by Chaosium in 1986 for the horror role-playing game Call of Cthulhu that features six adventures set in the world of H.P. Lovecraft's Dream cycle stories. There have been 5 editions.

Contents
H.P. Lovecraft's Dreamlands is a 136-page perfect-bound softcover book with three pages of color plates and a large two-color fold-out map. It was designed by Sandy Petersen, Keith Herber, K. L. Campbell-Robson, Scott Clegg, Richard T. Launius, Mark Morrison, Phil Frances, Lynn Willis, Susan Hutchinson, Jacqueline Clegg, and Jeff Okamoto. The color plates were created by Tom Sullivan and Mark Roland, and the cover art was by Raymond Bayless. 

The book contains six adventures for Call of Cthulhu that are based on the early fantasies of H. P. Lovecraft such as The Dream-Quest of Unknown Kadath, Celephaïs, and The Cats of Ulthar. These adventures enable adventures in the mysterious alternate reality called the Dreamlands. 

The book also contains two new skills that can only be used in the Dreamlands, as well as a compendium of creatures that inhabitant that reality.

The adventures are:
 To Sleep, Perchance to Dream, an introduction to the Dreamlands
 Captives of the Two Worlds, which provides the Dreamlands as a potential source of information during normal investigations
 Pickman's Student allows the Investigators to travel between reality and the Dreamlands again
 Season of the Witch involves a long-dead witch who has existed in the Dreamlands, waiting for a chance to strike back
 Lemon Sails takes Investigators on a quest to aid someone in the Dreamlands
 The Land of Lost Dreams forces Investigators to confront their worst nightmares

Reception
In the August-September 1987 edition of Space Gamer/Fantasy Gamer (No. 79), Guy Hail gave a thumbs up, saying, "Beyond the adventures, Dreamlands opens up a vast new area of role-playing potential." 

In the June 1990 edition of Dragon (Issue 158), Jim Bambra was enthusiastic about this book, saying that it "greatly expands the options available to Keepers. Its resemblance to a fantasy world allows Keepers to let their Investigators enjoy a change of pace and emphasis." He concluded with a strong recommendation: "Rather than merely dwell on its fantastic aspect, the adventure authors have expertly integrated the horror of COC with the strange dream reality. Dreamlands is yet another great COC supplement."

Reviews
Different Worlds #47 (Fall, 1987)
Valkyrie #15 (1997)
 Casus Belli #33 (June 1986)

See also 

 S. Petersen's Field Guide to Creatures of the Dreamlands

References

Call of Cthulhu (role-playing game) supplements
Role-playing game supplements introduced in 1986